Aerie is a literary magazine established in 1996 at the University of Hartford, though the journal has roots dating back to the early 1970s. Presently, it is run through a student board. It is released annually in the spring semester, with a notable exception in 2020 and 2021 due to the COVID-19 pandemic.

History 
Aerie was preceded by a small literary magazine, The Hog River Review, that was started in 1972. Other campus publications included: From the Workshop, a product of Friday afternoon get-togethers; Explorations, composed exclusively of freshman literary accomplishments; and Conception, a creation of the English Department's honor society, Sigma Tau Delta. When Aerie was started in 1996, it served as a venue for the English Department to publish pieces from the department's annual writing contest. This new literary magazine was run exclusively by faculty.

Aerie did not exist in its current form until Volume 5 in 2001 when a student editorial board took the reins. The magazine then began accepting submissions from undergraduate students. Up until the 2022-2023 school year, Benjamin Grossberg was the faculty advisor. The current faculty advisor is now Erin Striff.

See also
List of literary magazines

References

External links
 
 Official Instagram

Annual magazines published in the United States
Literary magazines published in the United States
Student magazines published in the United States
Magazines established in 1996
Magazines published in Connecticut
University of Hartford